Alapınar may refer to the following places in Turkey:

 Alapınar, Kozan, a village in the district of Kozan, Adana Province
 Alapınar, Kurucaşile, a village in the district of Kurucaşile, Bartın Province
 Alapınar, Refahiye